Harbaugh is a surname which is the americanized form of the German name Harbach. Notable people with the surname include:

 Carl Harbaugh, film actor, screenwriter, director
 Gregory J. Harbaugh, astronaut
 Leonard Harbaugh, colonial-era American architect
 Henry Harbaugh Apple, clergyman
 Henry Harbaugh, clergyman and writer
 Jack Harbaugh (born 1939), American football coach
 Jim Harbaugh (born 1963), Jack's younger son, American football coach
 John Harbaugh (born 1962), Jack's older son, American football coach
 Thomas Chalmers Harbaugh, poet

See also
 Harbaugh's Reformed Church